Senator Drum may refer to:

Augustus Drum (1815–1858), Pennsylvania State Senate
Henry Drum (1857–1950), Washington State Senate